In enzymology, a flavone 7-O-beta-glucosyltransferase is an enzyme that catalyzes the chemical reaction

UDP-glucose + 5,7,3',4'-tetrahydroxyflavone  UDP + 7-O-beta-D-glucosyl-5,7,3',4'-tetrahydroxyflavone

Thus, the two substrates of this enzyme are UDP-glucose and 5,7,3',4'-tetrahydroxyflavone (luteolin), whereas its two products are UDP and 7-O-beta-D-glucosyl-5,7,3',4'-tetrahydroxyflavone (cynaroside).

This enzyme belongs to the family of glycosyltransferases, specifically the hexosyltransferases.  The systematic name of this enzyme class is UDP-glucose:5,7,3',4'-tetrahydroxyflavone 7-O-beta-D-glucosyltransferase. Other names in common use include UDP-glucose-apigenin beta-glucosyltransferase, UDP-glucose-luteolin beta-D-glucosyltransferase, uridine diphosphoglucose-luteolin glucosyltransferase, uridine diphosphoglucose-apigenin 7-O-glucosyltransferase, and UDP-glucosyltransferase.  This enzyme participates in flavonoid biosynthesis.

References 

 

EC 2.4.1
Enzymes of unknown structure
Flavones metabolism